The 1875–76 Harvard Crimson football team represented Harvard University in the 1875 college football season. The team finished with a 4–0 record and was retroactively named as the national champion by the National Championship Foundation and as a co-national champion by Parke H. Davis. The team captain was William A. Whiting.

Schedule

Standings

References

Harvard
Harvard Crimson football seasons
College football national champions
College football undefeated seasons
Harvard Crimson football